Fusivoluta is a genus of sea snails and marine gastropod mollusks in the family Volutidae.

Species
Species within the genus Fusivoluta include:
 Fusivoluta anomala (Martens, 1902)
 Fusivoluta barnardi Rehder, 1969
 Fusivoluta blaizei (Barnard, 1959)
 Fusivoluta clarkei Rehder, 1969
 Fusivoluta decussata Barnard, 1959
 Fusivoluta lemaitrei Poppe, 1992
 Fusivoluta profundorum Bail & Puillandre, 2012
 Fusivoluta pyrrhostoma (Watson, 1882)
 Fusivoluta sculpturata (Tomlin, 1945)
 Fusivoluta wesselsi Kilburn, 1980
Species brought into synonymy
 Fusivoluta aikeni Lussi, 2011: synonym of  Belomitra aikeni (Lussi, 2011) (original combination)
 Fusivoluta capensis (Thiele, 1925): synonym of Glypteuthria capensis Thiele, 1925
 Fusivoluta elegans Barnard, 1959: synonym of Exilia elegans (Barnard, 1959) (original combination)

Distribution
This marine genus is restricted to southern African waters and adjacent areas.

References

 Bail P. & Poppe G.T. 2001. A conchological iconography: a taxonomic introduction of the recent Volutidae. ConchBooks, Hackenheim. 30 pp, 5 pl.
 Bail P. & Puillandre N. (2012) A new species of Fusivoluta Martens, 1902 (Gastropoda: Volutidae) from Mozambique. The Nautilus 126(4): 127–135

External links
 Martens E. von. (1902). Einige neue Arten von Meer-Conchylien aus den Sammlungen der deutschen Tiefsee-Expedition unter der Leitung von Prof. Carl Chun, 1898–99. Sitzungs-Berichte der Gesellschaft naturforschender Freunde zu Berlin. (1902): 237-244

Volutidae